Zhalan Cemetery is a former Jesuit burial ground in Beijing. It was initially established in the late Ming Dynasty for the burial of Matteo Ricci. The current setup is a restoration using original carved tombstones, following multiple episodes of desecration and turmoil during the Boxer Rebellion, the 1950s and the Cultural Revolution.

History

Ricci had wished to be buried in Beijing, as a rare honor for a non-Chinese foreigner and a recognition of the status of the Catholic Church in the Empire. Following his death on 11 May 1610, the Wanli Emperor allowed Diego de Pantoja to create a burial ground. The imperial decision was implemented on a lot that had been recently confiscated from a disgraced eunuch, outside the Fuchengmen gate of the Beijing city fortifications. A funeral ceremony was held on 22 April 1611, with a procession starting from the Jesuit premises where the Cathedral of the Immaculate Conception now stands. Ricci's coffin stayed at the cemetery's chapel for several months until it was finally buried in November 1611.

Other Jesuits were buried on the ground in the ensuing years. In 1654, Johann Adam Schall von Bell obtained from the Shunzhi Emperor the authorization to extend the cemetery. Shall von Bell was himself buried there in 1666.

Following the Suppression of the Society of Jesus by the Holy See in 1773, the Lazarists took care of the cemetery, then the archimandrite of the Chinese Orthodox Church, then again the Catholic Church.

The cemetery was vandalized in 1900 during the Boxer Rebellion, and the bones of the interred Jesuits were dispersed. Its restoration, stipulated by the Boxer Protocol, included the brick framing of some of the delicately carved tombstones. At the same time a church dedicated to Mary was erected nearby (Maweigou Church, :zh:馬尾溝教堂).

In the mid-1950s, remains including hundreds of tombstones were moved to the Xibeiwang area of Beijing (now the Catholic Cemetery, :zh:北京天主教陵園). A Communist Party of China school, now the Beijing Administration Institute, was established on the grounds. Because of their historical significance, however, the tombstones of Ricci, Johann Adam Schall von Bell and Ferdinand Verbiest were kept on the original ground. Other monumental tombstones were aligned against the Maweigou Church's wall.

During the Cultural Revolution, the site was again targeted as a symbol of foreign domination. The Red Guards intended to destroy the tombstones, but a staff member of the party school persuaded them to bury them instead, which ensured their preservation. The Maweigou Church was demolished in 1974.

In the late 1970s, Deng Xiaoping approved the restoration of Matteo Ricci's grave. The tombstones of Ricci, Schall von Bell and Verbiest were once again re-erected on what was believed to be their original locations. 60 additional original tombstones were re-erected in 1984 in a fenced section, of which 14 of Chinese converts and 46 of European missionaries.

Jean-Luc Dehaene, Valéry Giscard d'Estaing, Sergio Mattarella, Giorgio Napolitano, Jorge Sampaio, Oscar Luigi Scalfaro and Miloš Zeman are among the foreign dignitaries who have visited the cemetery with their Chinese official hosts since.

Tombstones

The tombstone uniquely combine Western and Chinese features. Each of them is topped by a dragon framing the christogram of the Society of Jesus, and includes a text in Latin (to the left) and Chinese (to the right). The epitaph of Matteo Ricci, for example, includes summary biographical information.

Notable burials at Zhalan

Among the prominent early modern missionaries and scholars who were buried there are, listed in chronological order of burial:
 Matteo Ricci (1552–1610)
 Johann Schreck (or Terrenz) (1576–1630)
 Giacomo Rho (1593–1638)
 Nicolò Longobardo (1559–1654)
 Johann Adam Schall von Bell (1591–1666)
 Gabriel de Magalhães (1610–1677)
 Lodovico Buglio (1606–1682)
 Ferdinand Verbiest (1623–1688)
  (1664–1704)
 Thomas Pereira (1645–1708)
 Antoine Thomas (1644–1709)
 Caspar Castner (1655–1709)
  (1655–1720)
  (1658–1740)
 Xavier Ehrenbert Fridelli (1673–1743)
 Ignaz Kögler (1680–1746)
 Teodorico Pedrini (1671–1746)
 Louis Fan born Fan Shouyi (1682–1753)
 Giuseppe Castiglione (1688–1766)
  (1706–1771)
 Anton Gogeisl (1701–1771)
 Ferdinand Augustin Hallerstein (1703–1774)
 Ignatius Sichelbart (1708–1780)

Most of the above-listed Jesuits' original tombstones are still at Zhalan, though not those of Longobardo Buglio, Pereira and Pedrini.

Zhengfu Temple Jesuit Cemetery

In the 18th century, a separate cemetery was established by French Jesuits in the Haidian District of Beijing. That cemetery no longer exists, but some of its remaining tombstones are exhibited in the open-air Beijing Art Museum of Stone Carvings at the Zhenjue Temple, including those of Jean-François Gerbillon (1654–1707), Joachim Bouvet (1656–1730), Dominique Parrenin (1665–1741), François Xavier d'Entrecolles (1664–1741), Pierre Nicolas d'Incarville (1706–1757), Michel Benoist (1715–1774) and Pierre-Martial Cibot (1727–1780).

See also
 List of Jesuit sites

Notes

External links
 

Major National Historical and Cultural Sites in Beijing
Cemeteries in Beijing